Parade Square is a square in downtown Warsaw. Located between Świętokrzyska (Holy Cross) Street in the north, Aleje Jerozolimskie (Jerusalem Avenues) in the south,  Marszałkowska Street in the east and the monumental Palace of Culture and Science to the west, it is one of Warsaw's central squares. It's one of the largest city squares in the world, and the second largest in the European Union, after the Alexanderplatz in Berlin, Germany.

It is one of the youngest squares in Warsaw, built in the 1950s together with the Palace of Culture and Science. It was used extensively by the government of People's Republic of Poland for various propaganda parades. The biggest parade held was in 1966 to mark the millennium year of the Polish nation.

Parade Square held a key place in the events of 1956. After Władysław Gomułka's restoration to power, on 24 October a rally was held in the square attended by around 400,000 people. During his speech at the rally, Gomułka condemned Stalinism and announced reforms aimed at democratizing the political system. A symbol of the changes was the refusal to accept Konstantin Rokossovsky, while the microphone was given to activist Lechosław Goździk. The crowd in the square expressed support for the reforms of Polish October, but they also demanded the release from prison of Cardinal Stefan Wyszyński, the leader of the Catholic church in Poland. Gomułka's singing of One Hundred Years (Sto lat) became legendary.

On 14 June 1987, during the third apostolic journey to Poland, Pope John Paul II celebrated Mass in the square, ending the Second National Eucharistic Congress. The altar was located at the main entrance to the Palace of Culture and Science. During the Mass, the pope beatified Bishop Michał Kozal, who died in the Dachau concentration camp during the Second World War.

The square lost its importance after the fall of communism, becoming the site of a giant marketplace for some time.

Criticized for unplanned ugliness and chaos in the center of a modern capital city, several plans have been made to modernize it and/or replace with something else including plans to construct a Museum of Modern Art in its place (opening 2019) and general gentrification of a square with a new concert hall, different skyscrapers and other facilities.

During the UEFA Euro 2012, which Warsaw was a host city for, a large Fan Zone was located there.

Currently (2017) it is mainly used as a car park and the marketplace has been removed, its role mostly absorbed by the new suburban market at Marywilska 44. The city plans to allow construction on the site of the square. The parking spaces are to be moved to a new, underground facility.

See also 
 The Museum of Modern Art, Warsaw currently located nearby and expecting to move into a new purpose built building in Parade Square.

References

External links 

Squares in Warsaw
National squares
Stalinist architecture
Śródmieście, Warsaw